Wola Wiśniowska  is a village in the administrative district of Gmina Staszów, within Staszów County, Świętokrzyskie Voivodeship, in south-central Poland.

The village has a population of  401.

Demography 
According to the 2002 Poland census, there were 375 people residing in Wola Wiśniowska village, of whom 50.4% were male and 49.6% were female. In the village, the population was spread out, with 25.3% under the age of 18, 38.4% from 18 to 44, 20.8% from 45 to 64, and 15.5% who were 65 years of age or older.
 Figure 1. Population pyramid of village in 2002 — by age group and sex

References

Villages in Staszów County